Jerry R. Birdwell was the former mayor of South Lake Tahoe, California and judge of Dallas County's 195th Judicial District Court.  Birdwell was the first openly gay judge appointed in Texas.

Early life and education
Birdwell received a B.A. from Baylor University and a J.D. from Baylor Law School.

Judicial service
On May 22, 1992, Governor Ann Richards appointed Birdwell to be judge of Dallas County's 195th Judicial District Court. She claimed that his sexual orientation was not a factor in his appointment, but gay rights groups promoted his appointment as a historical milestone, while Republican politicians called it a "slap in the face" to voters. Birdwell took office on May 29, 1992, but was defeated for reelection later that year by John R. Nelms after a homophobic campaign.  Birdwell left office on December 31, 1992.

Political career
In 2006, Birdwell began a four-year term on the city council of South Lake Tahoe, California.  On December 9, 2008, Birdwell was elected to serve a one-year term as mayor of South Lake Tahoe.

See also 
 List of LGBT jurists in the United States

References

Living people
Baylor University alumni
LGBT judges
Gay politicians
LGBT mayors of places in the United States
Mayors of places in California
American judges
Texas state court judges
People from South Lake Tahoe, California
Year of birth missing (living people)
LGBT appointed officials in the United States
20th-century American judges
American gay men